Fallicambarus is a genus of crayfish in the family Cambaridae from the United States and Canada. It includes 12 species, of which one is on the IUCN Red List as a vulnerable species (VU) and one as an endangered species (EN). The species of this genus are all restricted to three states or fewer, from Texas and Oklahoma east to Florida.

The subgenus Creaserinus formerly contained eight additional species of Fallicambarus, but has been elevated in rank to genus, resulting in the transfer of those species from Fallicambarus to Creaserinus.

Species
These twelve species are members of the genus Fallicambarus.

Fallicambarus devastator (Hobbs & Whiteman, 1987)  – Texas
Fallicambarus dissitus (Penn, 1955)  (Pine Hills Digger) – Arkansas, Louisiana
Fallicambarus harpi (Hobbs & Robison, 1985)  (Ouachita burrowing crayfish) – Arkansas
Fallicambarus houstonensis (Johnson, 2008)  – Texas
Fallicambarus jeanae (Hobbs, 1973)  – Arkansas
Fallicambarus kountzeae (Johnson, 2008)  – Texas
Fallicambarus macneesei (Black, 1967)  (Old Prairie Digger) – Louisiana, Texas
Fallicambarus petilicarpus (Hobbs & Robison, 1989)  (slenderwrist burrowing crayfish) - Arkansas
Fallicambarus schusteri (Taylor & Robison, 2016) - Oklahoma, Arkansas
Fallicambarus strawni (Reimer, 1966)  (Saline burrowing crayfish) – Arkansas
Fallicambarus tenuis (Hobbs, 1950)  (Ouachita Mountain crayfish) - Oklahoma, Arkansas
Fallicambarus wallsi (Johnson, 2011) - Texas

References

External links

Cambaridae
Decapod genera
Crustacean genera
Taxa named by Horton H. Hobbs Jr.
Taxonomy articles created by Polbot